These are the official results of the Men's 100 metres event at the 1991 IAAF World Championships in Tokyo, Japan. There were a total number of 77 participating athletes, with ten qualifying heats and the final held on Sunday 25 August 1991. The world record, African record, and European record were broken by Carl Lewis, Frankie Fredericks, and Linford Christie, respectively. The then world record holder Leroy Burrell also bettered his previous mark of 9.90 seconds while Ray Stewart set the Jamaican record for the event.

Medalists

Schedule
All times are Japan Standard Time (UTC+9)

Records
Existing records at the start of the event.

Final

Semifinals
Held on Sunday 1991-08-25

Quarterfinals
Held on Saturday 1991-08-24

Qualifying heats
Held on Saturday 1991-08-24

See also
 1990 Men's European Championships 100 metres (Split)
 1992 Men's Olympic 100 metres (Barcelona)
 1993 Men's World Championships 100 metres (Stuttgart)

References

External links

 Results

 
100 metres at the World Athletics Championships